The Federal Service for Alcohol Market Regulation or Rosalkogolregulirovanie (in Russian: Федеральная служба по регулированию алкогольного рынка, Росалкогольрегулирование) is a federal law enforcement agency of executive authority responsible for drafting and implementing state policy and legal regulation in the production and circulation of ethyl alcohol and alcohol products, as well as functions to control the production and trafficking ethyl alcohol and alcohol-containing products, to oversee and provide services in this area

The Service is under the jurisdiction of the Federal Government of Russia.

History
The Federal Service for Alcohol Market Regulation was established by Presidential Decree from 31 December 2008 No. 1883 "On the formation of the Federal Service for Alcohol Market Regulation".

In Section 2 of the Government direction from 24 February 2009 No. 154 "On the Federal Service for Alcohol Market Regulation," found that the Federal Service for Alcohol Market Regulation is the unification of various functions from the Ministry of Agriculture, Ministry of Finance, the Federal Tax Service and the Federal Service for Tariff in respect of all obligations in the sphere of production and turnover of ethyl alcohol and alcohol-containing products, including obligations arising from the execution of court decisions.

On November 30, 2009 the Federal Service for Alcohol Market Regulation issued an order No. 17 "On the establishment and administration of the minimum price of vodka for retail sale until January 1, 2010" according to which from 1 January 2010, the minimum price of vodka for retail sale was set at a rate of 89 rubles per 0.5 liter of the finished product (€2.52 per liter circa).

Directors
A list of directors since 2008:
 2008–2018: Igor Chuyan
 2018–: Igor Alyoshin

See also
Alcoholism in Russia
Bureau of Alcohol, Tobacco, Firearms and Explosives
Bureau of Prohibition
Vodka
Prohibition in the Russian Empire and the Soviet Union

External links
Official Site

References

Alcohol abuse in Russia
Law enforcement agencies of Russia